Vary Peri, also called Sweets Fairy or Magical Wizard Cake Fairy is a 2012 Korean-Chinese Cel Shaded 3D Animated series based on character created by InfinityOne Comics Entertainment, animated by Alpha Group Company in China & CJ E&M in South Korea. It was produced by Anthony Chen, directed by Han Feng and written by Lu Lingyi, Wang Wei and Ming Riye. It first aired on the Chinese channel Golden Eagle Television and the Cable channel JiaJia Kids from 10 November 2012 to 18 February 2013 with a total of 40 Episodes.

Vary Peri is officially based on the toys of the same name which utilizes a pop-up function when pressed. The overall theme of the series is Desserts and Sweets, as shown to the main characters and the setting. The series is very notable for copying various concepts from Spin Master and Sega Sammy Holdings's toy franchise Zoobles, particularly the Japanese/Korean Version.

Story
The Sweetsheart Kingdom is a magical world filled with various sweets and pastries, inhabited by animal people who are good patisseries and cooks experting on each dessert. The kingdom's only Princess, Mousse Bibi is soon going to ascend to the throne as the new Queen, however all she cared on her life is to taste various kinds of cakes and sweets. One day, Lyan, her royal adviser, set up a plan by making her suffer Ageusia. As she is shocked that she can no longer taste anything, he told her that the only way to cure her condition is to search for the legendary magic called Delicious Miracle. She immediately left the castle and venture outside, not knowing to her that Lyan is doing this to eradicate her.

Upon her arrival at the town called Cake Village, she first met a denizen of the village named Mocha Dennis, who is very obsessed on his looks. Though the meeting between both him and Bibi is unsettling. She is also unaware that she possesses a hidden potential that would help her search for the legendary magic and be the key on changing the fate of the Sweetsheart Kingdom once and for all!

Characters

Cake Fairies
Mousse Bibi
Voiced by: Deng Hong
A Female Strawberry Mousse Cake Rabbit, Mousse Bibi is the Princess of the Sweetsheart Kingdom. She is very dimwitted yet kindhearted girl who likes to think big and has a playful and lively personality. Bibi also loves to eat sweets and watch anime, and she is very good on making tea but is very bad on baking. She rarely gets along with Mocha Dennis, though in the end she finally appreciates him as a friend. Her star sign is Gemini.

Bibi is supposed to ascend to the throne and become Queen until Lyan decided to make her suffer Aguesia, forcing her to go to the Cake Village to search for the Delicious Miracle, the only magic that can cure her. She also possess an unusual ability when she eats a dessert that is blessed with the Delicious Miracle, allowing her to transform into her Fairy Form in order to do purification magic. She is also the first person to unlock her Cake Fairy abilities. By the end of the series, she finally became Queen after her sense of taste returned.

Mocha Dennis
Voiced by: Liu Pei
A Male Mocha Cupcake Bear (Although his design is similar to a panda), Mocha Dennis is Bibi's first friend she met in the Cake Village and the cousin of Parfait Chacha. He cares a lot about his image and is a neat freak, usually does things in a leisurely way. He is also very strong willed though has a fear on bugs. Dennis is an expert patisserie and usually teaches Bibi how to bake properly. He rarely gets along with Bibi though he starts to develop some feelings to her. His star sign is Libra.

He first met Bibi at episode 1 alongside Parfait Chacha, though the meeting is very unexpected for the both of them. is the second person to unlock his Cake Fairy abilities in episode 3. He is also in suspicion regarding Lyan's action until he found out his true motives.

Vanilla Ellie
Voiced by: Liao Chunyu
A Female Vanilla Mille Crepe Cake Sheep, Vanilla Ellie is Bibi's best friend in Cake Village. She is weakly willed, but she is also has a romantic personality and is a very nice girl. Ellie also loves reading the Horoscope and usually makes stuffed animals (though they look a bit bad, Bibi loves them). Her star sign is Virgo.

Bibi met her at episode 3 and first thought she's a monster all thanks to Angel spreading false rumors about her. After a while, the two reconcile and got along well as they both became best friends. She is the fifth person to unlock her Cake Fairy abilities.

Blueberry Angel
Voiced by: Zhao Na
A Female Blueberry Cupcake Peacock, Blueberry Angel is the owner and manager of the pastry shop "Blue Berry". She is very proud, smart, always bossy regarding her work and also a bit of tomboyish due her attitude. Angel can be a bit cold-hearted and strict sometimes, usually has a huge ambition to become the best patisserie in the Sweetsheart Kingdom. She bakes cakes as a hobby, often some of them are blessed with Delicious Miracle, and treats Tia as her best friend. She also admires Lyne due to his baking skills until the reveal and she is allergic to grass pollen. Her star sign is Capricorn.

She and Tia first met Bibi at Episode 1, mistaking her as a thief who wants to take away one of her decorated masterpiece. Angel also witnessed Bibi's fairy form for the first time, thinking she is a monster and became cold to her. She then become friends with her in Episode 4. Angel is the third person to unlock her Cake Fairy abilities.

Orange Tia
Voiced by: Zu Liqing
A Female Orange Pudding Cake Deer Fawn, Orange Tia is Angel's close friend. She is very studious and usually more mature than the others, though she can have a very sharp tongue. She is also very calm and is very prepared on some situations and loves to read a lot of books, often being called a nerd sometimes. When she's stuck in a situation, she comes up with ideas. Tia is also a very good specialist on desserts and worked with Angel together in some of their creations. She owns an heirloom crown at her house and has a cousin named Niva, a very mischievous cat. Her star sign is Scorpio.

She and Angel first met Bibi at Episode 1, thinking she's a thief who wants to take away one of Angel's decorated masterpiece. Tia also witnessed Bibi's fairy form for the first time, and knew that she has hidden abilities that she can discover. Tia is the seventh person to unlock her Cake Fairy abilities.

Parfait Chacha
Voiced by: Li Jing
A Female Green Tea Cake Dog, Parfait Chacha is a noblewoman living in the Cake Village and also Mocha Dennis's cousin. She is a very playful girl who is very spoiled on things, especially her engagement with Dennis. She is also very haughty, ambitious and really motivated in which she will do everything to get Dennis's attention. She also hates Bibi due to the fact he focuses on her more than she does, but later in the final episode, they became friends. Her star sign is Pisces.

She first met Bibi at episode 1 alongside Dennis, though the meeting between him and Bibi broke her heart. After Episode 34, her parents went bankrupt and decided to move away from Cake Village, leaving her behind. She now currently lives with Peach, working for a living. She is the sixth person to unlock her Cake Fairy abilities.

Strawberry Jessie
Voiced by: Li Jing
A Female Strawberry Pudding Cake Hen Chick, Strawtberry Jessie is an herbalist living in the outskirts of Cake Village. She is very timid, shy and laid back, usually living alone before she met Bibi. Jessie is also dislikes both Durians and Lightning but has a liking on egg rolls. Her star sign is Aquarius.

Bibi first met her in Episode 5 and befriended her despite her being an outcast. Later on, she and her friends learned that she is the guardian of the Vanilla Valley, which is a place filled with various kinds of herbs. Her ancestors and family guarded the valley for centuries before she's given the task. She is the fourth person to unlock her Cake Fairy abilities.

Tiramisu Cavan
Voiced by: Zhao Ran
A Male Tiramisu Penguin, Tiramisu Cavan is Cake Village's genius gadgeteer. He is a very nice person who usually focuses on inventing things and likes to study mechanical things. He has bad eyesight and usually rely on his glasses to see. Cavan usually gets along with Tia but he is best friends with Peach. His star sign is Taurus.

Bibi and her friends first met him at Episode 14, who is building several theme park rides for everyone in Cake Village. His dream is to build a "Dream Paradise" for everyone. He is the ninth person to unlock his Cake Fairy abilities.

Honey Peach
Voiced by: Li Jing
A Female Honey Cake Bee, Honey Peach is the village's resident honey expert. She is very workaholic, kind to people, and a tomboy, where she raises them to make honey. She is also very caring to small animals and hates to see her prized honey bees to get hurt. She is best friends with Tiramisu Cavan and share a relationship together. Her star sign is Sagittarius.

Bibi first met her in Episode 16 and she and Cavan became best friends in Episode 17. She is the eight person to unlock her Cake Fairy abilities.

Ice Cream Sarah
Voiced by: Zu Liqing
A Female Ice Cream Cake Panda, Ice Cream Sara is a newcomer in the Cake Village who specializes on dried fruits. She is very full of enthusiasm and is optimistic and passionate on her work, especially her job but she can get a little homesick. On her first appearance, she makes friends with Bibi and later with the rest of the crew. Her star sign is Leo.

Bibi first met her in Episode 21 as she found out she arrived in Cake Village, mistaken it for her hometown: the Ice Cream Village. Lyne found out about this and used this to his schemes but failed. She is the last person to unlock her Cake Fairy abilities.

Side Characters
Chief Nicolas
Voiced by: Zhao Ran
A Male King Chef Elephant and the Mayor of the Cake Village, he always appears through a hot air balloon to greet Bibi and her friends.

Crepe Gugu
Voiced by: Zhao Na
A Female Orange Cream Puff dog, Crepe Gugu is the twin sister of Vanilla Gigi as well as Chacha's assistants. She usually behave nicely in front of Chacha though often the two argue sometimes. Usually the two always agrees on Chacha's ideas and always go for them.

Vanilla Gigi
Voiced by: Liao Chunyu
A Female Vanilla Cream Puff dog, Vanilla Gigi is the twin sister of Crepe Gugu as well as Chacha's assistants. She usually behave nicely in front of Chacha though often the two argue sometimes. Usually the two always agrees on Chacha's ideas and always go for them.

Cherry Dandan
Voiced by: Deng Hong
A young female Cherry Cake squirrel, Cherry Dandan is the best friend of both Gugu and Gigi. She usually tags along both of them and likes to play with the two sisters.

Aunt Anna
Voiced by: Liao Chunyu
A Female Orange Herb Tea dog, she is Parfait Chacha's mother. She is very well dressed, and she and her husband tend to be very anxious for their daughter's well-being, but especially her.

Uncle Jeff
Voiced by: Liu Pei
A Brown Herb Tea dog who is Parfait ChaCha's father.

Niva
Voiced by: Zhao Na
A Female Strawberry cat, Niva is Tia's cousin. She is very mischievous thought sometimes well behaved.

Antagonists
Lyan
Voiced by: Zhao Ran
A male Bagel lion, Lyan is Mousse Bibi's royal adviser and the series's main antagonist. He is nice and very supportive, however he has a very dark and evil side and will do anything to eradicate the Princess. On his stay in the Cake Village, he wears his special disguise in order for the others not to recognize him. His star sign is Aries.

He is usually jealous when he first heard Bibi is gonna ascend to the throne and wants it for himself. Because of this, he made a cake that would make her suffer Ageusia and the one telling her to search for the Delicious Miracle for his personal goal. However, in the finale, he finally changed his ways after Bibi talked to him.

Episodes
There were 40 episodes in total, running from 12 November 2012 - 13 February 2013.

 Welcome to the Sweetsheart Kingdom!
 The Big Bake-off 
 When Bibi met Ellie 
 When Bibi and Angel were Rivals 
 Jessie Comes to Visit 
 A Trip to Vanilla Valley
 Ellie in Distress 
 Cake Fairies at Sea 
 Firefly Follies 
 Double Cousin
 Down on the Sweetsheart Farm 
 Chacha's Big Diet 
 Ellie and the Little Blackbird 
 Dr. Cavan the Smart Cookie 
 Beatin' the Heat
 A Buzzy Day at the Cake Village 
 Peach and Cavan Save the Day 
 A Taste of Christmas 
 The Lucky Color Cake
 I've Been Toothached!
 Sarah the Little Ice Cream Panda
 A Frutti Tutti Adventure
 Ellie's Unlucky Fortune
 A Secret Recipe Revealed 
 Niva: Tia's Little Cousin
 Birthday Bashers
 Dennis' (Not so) Ordinary Day
 Gugu and Gigi Hangout
 Jessie's the Most Important One
 Not your Ordinary Lyan! (part 1)
 Not your Ordinary Lyan! (part 2)
 Ambassador Bibi
 A Piece of Problem Pie
 Chacha the Beekeeper
 Hypno Style
 The Lost Time Capsule
 A Catastrophe at the Cake Village 
 The Search for the Light of Hope
 The Big and Magical Sweetsheart Kingdom Cake
 It's Transformation Time!

See also
Zoobles

References

General
 https://web.archive.org/web/20121231221014/http://comic.letv.com/zt/cakesweet/index.shtml

Specific

External links
 Official Website

2012 Chinese television series debuts
2013 Chinese television series endings
2010s animated television series
Mandarin-language television shows
Cel-shaded animation
Chinese children's animated adventure television series
Chinese children's animated comedy television series
Computer-animated television series